The Cisco Nexus series switches are modular and fixed port network switches designed for the data center. Cisco Systems introduced the Nexus Series of switches on January 28, 2008.  The first chassis in the Nexus 7000 family is a 10-slot chassis with two supervisor engine slots and eight I/O module slots at the front, as well as five crossbar switch fabric modules at the rear. Beside the Nexus 7000 there are also other models in the Nexus range.

All switches in the Nexus range run the modular NX-OS firmware/operating system on the fabric. NX-OS has some high-availability features compared to the well-known Cisco IOS. This platform is optimized for high-density 10 Gigabit Ethernet.

The Nexus switching range
Cisco Nexus OS Software Defined Networking (SDN) allows the same policies that govern Identity and Access Management (IAM) to dictate levels of access to applications and data through a totally converged infrastructure not possible with legacy network and system access methods.

The Nexus 9000 is the high-end model in the Nexus range of datacenter switches. Other models are:
 Nexus 1000v virtual switch
 Nexus 2000 fabric extender
 Nexus 3000 series
 Nexus 4001 IBM Blade Center switch
 Nexus 5000 series
 Nexus 6000 series
 Nexus 7000 series modular datacenter switches
 Nexus 9000 series

Nexus 1000v
The 1000v is a virtual switch for use in virtual environments including both VMware vSphere and Microsoft Hyper-V It is as such not a physical box but a software application that interacts with the hypervisor so you can virtualize the networking environment and be able to configure your system as if all virtual servers have connections to a physical switch and include the capabilities that a switch offers such as multiple VLANs per virtual interface, layer-3 options, security features etc. Per infrastructure/cluster you have one VM running the Nexus 1000v as virtual appliance, this is the VSM or Virtual Supervisor Module and then on each node you would have a 'client' or Virtual Ethernet Module (VEM) a vSwitch which replaces the standard vSwitch.

The VEM uses the vDS API, which was developed by VMware and Cisco together VMware announced in May 2017, vDS API support will be removed from vSphere 6.5 Update 2 and later. Therefore Nexus 1000v can no longer be used. VMware KB https://kb.vmware.com/s/article/2149722 https://www.theregister.co.uk/2017/03/31/vmware_to_end_support_for_thirdparty_virtual_switches/ 

Besides offering the NX-OS interface to configure, manage and monitor the virtual switch it also supports LACP link aggregation where the standard virtual switches only support static LAGs

The configuration of VEMs is done via the VSM NX-OS Command-line interface.

Nexus 1010 / 1010x / 1100x
The Virtual Supervisor Module or VSM would normally run as a virtual appliance in an ESX/ESXi cluster but it is possible to run the VSM on dedicated hardware: the Nexus 1010, 1010x and 1100. For organisations where there is a very strict boundary between network management and server management, network administrators can avoid the dependency on the VSM running as virtual machine within the ESX cluster. The capabilities and limitations of a VSM running on a Nexus1010 are the same as a VSM running as virtual appliance under ESX. A Nexus 1100 can host up to 14  VSMs and it also allows additional services such as a Network Analysis Module to be run.

Nexus 2000 series
The Nexus 2000 series are fabric extenders (FEX): 'top of rack' 1U high system that can be used in combination with higher end Nexus switches like the 5000, 6000 or 7000 series:  the 2000 series is not a 'stand-alone' switch but needs to be connected to a parent and should be seen as a 'module' or 'remote line card' but then installed in a 19" rack instead of in a main switch-enclosure. The interconnection between this 'remote line card' and the 5000 or 7000 parent switch uses either proprietary interfaces (CX-1 for copper or the short or long range Cisco Fabric Extender Transceiver (FET) interfaces), or standard interfaces (Cisco SFP+ SR and LR fibre interface modules or SFP+ Twinax cables). In combination with the 5000/6000/7000 mother-switch you can create a so-called Distributed Modular System.

The 2000 series consists of 4 different models. Three models offer 24 or 48 Gbit/s only or 1 Gbit/s/fastethernet copper interfaces and up to four 10 Gigabit uplink interfaces on copper or fibre. The Nexus 2232PP offers thirty-two 1/10 Gbit/s ethernet and FCoE interfaces.  The Nexus 2248PQ offers forty-eight 1/10 Gbit/s ethernet and FCoE interfaces.

For the HP BladeSystem C3000 and C7000 server blade chassis, the Cisco Nexus B22HP fabric extender exists. (October 2011)

The Fujitsu PRIMERGY BX400 and BX900 blade server chassis uses the B22F fabric extender. (July 2012)
For the Dell M1000e blade server chassis, the Cisco Nexus B22Dell fabric extender was released in January 2013, which is 2.5 years after the initially planned release. Due to a disagreement between Dell and Cisco, Cisco stopped development of the FEX for the M1000e in 2010

The Nexus B22FEX offer 16 x 10 Gbase-KR internal 10 Gbit/s link to each blade-server interface and up to 8 SFP+ ports for uplink with a Nexus 5010, 5548 or 5596 switch. The maximum distance between the FEX and the mother-switch is 3 kilometer when it is only used for TCP/IP traffic and 300 meter when carrying also FCoE traffic.

Nexus 3000 series
The model 3064 is currently the only Nexus switch in the 3000-series utilizing merchant silicon. The 1U rack-switch with 1, 10 and 40 Gbit/s ethernet interfaces is designed for use in colo center. Offers layer 2 and layer 3 capabilities at wire-speed for all 64 interfaces running in 10 Gbit/s. Layer3 routing protocols supported include static routes, RIP v2, OSPF and BGP-4. The switch-fabric can switch 2.28 Tbit/s and forward up to 950 million packets per second. The switch is capable of building a route-table with up to 16000 prefixes, 8000 host-entries and 4000 multicast routes and up to 4096 VLANs are supported. On top of that a high number of ingress or egress ACLs can be configured.

The 3064 has a single fan tray, two replaceable power-supplies on board and two separate out of band management interfaces. To connect the 3064 to the rest of the network the use of proprietary EtherChannel or Link aggregation using industry-standard LACP or IEEE 802.3ad is supported with up to 32 port-channels with each up to 16 physical interfaces.

The switch holds of 48 SFP+ for 1 Gbit/s or 10 Gbit/s ethernet interfaces and four QSFP+ each handling 4 x 10 Gbit/s interfaces allowing for 40 Gbit/s over a single fibre-pair

Nexus 4000 series
The Nexus 4000 series consists of only the model 4001: a blade-switch module for IBM BladeCenter that has all 10 Gbit Fibre Channel over Ethernet or FCoE interfaces. This blade-switch had 14 server-facing downlinks running on 1 Gbit/s or 10 Gbit/s and six uplinks using 10 Gbit/s SFP+ modules. For out-of-band management three ethernet-interfaces are available: one external 10/100/1000 bit/s copper interface, one internal management interface for the AMM or Advanced Management Module and one in-band interface using the VLAN interface option. And this blade-switch also has a serial console cable for direct access to the CLI
At present only switches for the IBM blade systems are available. When the Nexus 4000 series were announced in 2009 it was expected that there would be Nexus 4001 series for IBM and Dell (and not HP) but in February 2010 it became clear that Cisco canceled the Nexus 4001d for the Dell M1000e
For the HP blade system Cisco released a Fabric Extender, which compares with the Nexus 2000 top of rack devices, but then in a blade-form factor. The FEX that was developed for the Dell blade system, which was due to be released in the summer of 2010 was dropped at the same time as the Nexus 4001d in February of that year

Nexus 5000 series
The Nexus 5000 series is a range of 5 models 1U or 2U rack-switches offering 20 to 96 interfaces running on 1 or 10 Gbit/s ethernet and 10 Gbit/s FCoE interfaces. They can be used with the above-mentioned Nexus 2000 series fabric extender. The 5000-series offer carrier-grade layer2 and layer3 switching as well as the mentioned FCoE capabilities

The Nexus 5000 has 5 models:

Nexus 5010
 A one rack-unit high switch with 20 fixed 10 Gbit/s supporting ethernet, FCoE and DCB interfaces and one expansion port offering one of the following modules:
 8 ports with 1, 2 or 4 Gbit/s Fibre Channel
 6 ports with 1, 2, 4 or 8 Gbit/s Fibre Channel
 4 ports with 10 Gbit/s FCoE or DCB and 4 ports offering 1, 2 or 4 Gbit/s Fibre Channel
 6 ports offering 10 Gbit/s FCoE or DCB

 Nexus 5010 is End Of Life - http://www.cisco.com/c/en/us/products/collateral/switches/nexus-5000-series-switches/eol_c51-709037.html

Nexus 5020
A two rack-unit high switch with 40 fixed 10 Gbit/s supporting ethernet, FCoE and DCB and two expansion ports each offering one of the modules
 8 ports with 1, 2 or 4 Gbit/s Fibre Channel
 6 ports with 1, 2, 4 or 8 Gbit/s Fibre Channel
 4 ports with 10 Gbit/s FCoE or DCB and 4 ports offering 1, 2 or 4 Gbit/s Fibre Channel
 6 ports offering 10 Gbit/s FCoE or DCB
 Nexus 5020 is End of Life - http://www.cisco.com/c/en/us/products/collateral/switches/nexus-5000-series-switches/eol_c51-709037.html

Nexus 5548
The 5548 comes in two sub-models: the 5548P and 5548UP
 Nexus 5548P switch: 1U chassis with 32 fixed non-unified ports and up to 16 additional ports using the expansion slot. The 5548 chassis can be the main fabric for the Nexus 2000 series fabric extenders. The interfaces in the expansion slots are:
 16 port unified offering 1-10 Gbit/s SFP+ slot for ethernet and FCoE OR 1,2,4 or 8 native fibre channel
 16 port SFP+ 10 Gbit/s ethernet and FCoE
 8 ports SFP+ 10 Gbit/s ethernet and FCoE plus 8 ports 1,2,4 or 8 native fibre-channel.

 Nexus 5548UP: also a 1U chassis with 32 fixed unified ports and up to 16 additional ports using the expansion slot. The difference between the 5548P and 5548UP is that the 5548Ps fixed (on-board) SFP+ slots are non-unified there where the same SFP+ slots on the UP chassis are unified.

Nexus 5596
The 5596 comes in two sub-models the UP and the T:

 Nexus 5596UP: a two-RU chassis with 48 fixed unified ports and up to 48 additional interfaces in three expansion slots. Capabilities of the 5596UP is same as the 5548UP but this switch is two RU high and supports three expansion slots
 Nexus 5596T: a two-RU chassis with 48 fixed ports (32 of 10G Base-T + 16 SFP+) and up to 48 additional interfaces in three expansion slots. 5596T supports the upcoming 10G Base-T ports on the fixed as well as expansion slots along with supporting any other generic expansion modules that are supported on 5596UP.

Next to the expansion modules all three Nexus 55xx switches offer the capability to insert a 160Gbit/s layer-3 routing engine

Nexus 6000 series

The Cisco Nexus 6000 range contains two models, the 6001 model and the 6004 model. They can be used as layer2 and layer3 switches and can aggregate traffic from the Fabric Extenders (FEX) for different blade-server systems. Both models support either front to back or back to front airflow and they do support Fibre Channel over Ethernet in combination with a 'full' FCoE switch (e.g. Nexus 5500 or Brocade 8000 switch (which is same as Dell PowerConnect 8000e or blade version PCM 8428-k)).

Nexus 6001
The Nexus 6001 is a fixed 1 RU switch with 48 x 10 Gbit/s and 4 x 40 Gbit/s interfaces for uplinks. It can operate as both layer2 and as layer3 switch and in combination with FEX (fabric extenders) you can aggregate up to 1152 ports at 1 Gbit/s or 10 Gbit/s. System speed is wire-speed at layer2 and 1.28 Tbit/s for layer3 operation.

Nexus 6004 & 5696Q
The 2nd model in the Nexus 6000 series is a modular chassis, 4 Rack units high. The basic chassis offers 48 fixed QSFP+ ports at 40 Gbit/s each, each can be split in 4 x 10Gbit/s SFP+ ports. Besides the 48 QSFP+ ports the chassis can hold up to 4 expansion modules - each offering 12 additional 40Gbit/s QSFP+ ports - thus in total up to 96 QSFP+ ports or 384 SFP+/10Gbit/s ports and when aggregating FEX up to 1536 (blade)server ports at 1 or 10Gbit/s. As with the 6001 layer 2/layer 3 operation is at line-rate and total switching capacity of a chassis is 7,68Tbit/s.  The Nexus 6004-EF switch is a modular device which provides the same features as the 6004 but with the use of expansion modules in all slots of the switch.  The base configuration of the 6004-EF must have 2 x 12 port 40GbE expansion modules, delivering 24 ports of 40GbE or 96 ports of 10GbE.  Additional capacity can be provided by installing further expansion modules.

For layer3 and FCoE operation additional licences are required

Cisco released the Nexus 6004X switch and renamed it to the Nexus 5696Q. Previously, the Nexus 6000 series was meant to be focused on the Cisco 40G aggregation products, and the 5500 and 5600 series on 10G. However, these switches mostly shared common hardware components, ASICs, and the same software images, so recently the Cisco decided to merge the product portfolios.

Nexus 7000 series

Although the Nexus 5000 had some modular capabilities and you can attach the Nexus 2000 fabric extender to the 5500 range, the Nexus 7000 is the real modular switch in the Nexus family with six versions: one 4 slot, one 9 slot, two 10 slot and two 18 slot switches. Unlike the other Nexus models, the 7000 series switches are the modular switches for campus core and data center access, aggregation and core. Some details on the models are detailed below. As with the Nexus 5000 series the Nexus 2000 Fabric Extenders can act as a remote line card on the 7000 series. 70xx and 77xx linecards and supervisor modules are not compatible.

Nexus 7004 

 4 slots: 3-4 are line card slots, 1-2 are supervisor slots
 7 RU height
 Supports 96 1 or 10 Gbit/s ports (48 per slot), 12 40 Gbit/s ports (6 per slot) or 4 100 Gbit/s ports (2 per slot), all non-blocking ports
 1.92 Tbit/s system bandwidth
 440 Gbit/s, 720 million pps (720 Mpps) per slot
 Air flow is side to rear (input on right)
 The chassis does not have fabric modules, the I/O modules connect directly through the backplane
 Up to 4 power supplies.

Nexus 7009 

 9 slots: 3-9 are line card slots, 1-2 are supervisor slots
 14 RU height
 Supports 336 1 or 10 Gbit/s ports (48 per slot), 42 40 Gbit/s ports (6 per slot) or 14 100 Gbit/sc ports (2 per slot), all non-blocking ports
 8.8 Tbit/s system bandwidth
 550 Gbit/s, 720 Mpps per slot
 Air flow is side to side (right to left)
 Up to 5 Crossbar Fabric Modules
 Up to 2 power supplies

Nexus 7010 

 10 slots: 1-4 and 7-10 are line card slots, 5-6 are supervisor slots
 21 RU height
 Supports 384 1 or 10 Gbit/s ports (48 per slot), 48 40 Gbit/s ports (6 per slot) or 16 100 Gbit/s ports (2 per slot), all non-blocking ports
 550 Gbit/s, 720 Mpps per slot
 Air flow is front to back
 Up to 5 Crossbar Fabric Modules
 Up to 3 power supplies

Nexus 7018 

 18 slots: 1-8 and 11-18 are line card slots, 9-10 are supervisor slots
 25 RU height
 Supports 768 10 Gbit/s and/or 1 Gbit/s, all non-blocking ports
 Supports 768 1 or 10 Gbit/s ports (48 per slot), 96 40 Gbit/s ports (6 per slot) or 32 100 Gbit/s ports (2 per slot), all non-blocking ports
 18.7 Tbit/s system bandwidth
 550 Gbit/s, 720 Mpps per slot
 Air flow is side to side (right to left)
 Up to 5 Crossbar Fabric Modules
 Up to 4 power supplies

Nexus 7710 

 10 slots: 1-4 and 7-10 are line card slots, 5-6 are supervisor slots
 14 RU height
 Supports up to 384 10 Gbit/s ports, 192 40 Gbit/s ports or 96 100 Gbit/s ports, all non-blocking ports
 42 Tbit/s system bandwidth (21 Tbit/s full duplex)
 1.32 Tbit/s per slot
 Air flow is front to back
 Up to 6 switch fabric modules
 Up to 8 power supplies (3 kW each)
 6 microsecond Latency

Nexus 7718 

 18 slots: 1-8 and 11-18 are line card slots, 9-10 are supervisor slots
 26 RU height
 Supports up to 768 10 Gbit/s ports, 384 40 Gbit/s ports or 192 100 Gbit/s ports, all non-blocking ports
 83 Tbit/s system bandwidth (42 Tbit/s full duplex)
 1.32 Tbit/s per slot
 Air flow is front to back
 Up to 6 switch fabric modules
 Up to 16 power supplies (3 kW each)

Nexus 9000 series

The Nexus 9000 series is a range of many models 2U to 21U rack-switches offering 60 to 2304 interfaces running on 100Mb, 1Gb, 10Gb, 25Gb, 40Gb, 100Gb, 400Gb Ethernet, 10/25/40 Gb FCoE interfaces. They can be used with the above-mentioned Nexus 2000 series fabric extender. The 9000 series provides converged Active Directory (AD), Network Standard Execution, (NSX) and Application Centric Infrastructure (ACI) using Software Defined Networking (SDN) in a modified Nexus operating system (Nexus OS ACI).

The Nexus 9000 has many models:

Nexus 9396PX
 A two rack-unit high switch with 48 SFP+ 10Gbit/s supporting ethernet, FCoE and DCB interfaces and one expansion port offering the modules
 12 ports with 40Gb supporting ethernet, FCoE or DCB

Nexus 93128TX
 A three rack-unit high switch with 96 fixed 1/10Gbit/s supporting ethernet, FCoE and DCB interfaces and one expansion port offering the modules
 8 ports with 40 Gbit/s supporting ethernet, FCoE or DCB

Nexus 9504 

 4 line card slots
 7 RU height
 Supports 576 10 Gbit/s and/or 1 Gbit/s, all non-blocking ports
 15 Tbit/s system bandwidth

Nexus 9508 

 8 line card slots
 13 RU height
 Supports 1152 10 Gbit/s and/or 1 Gbit/s, all non-blocking ports
 30 Tbit/s system bandwidth

Nexus 9516 

 16 line card slots
 21 RU height
 Supports 2304 10 Gbit/s and/or 1 Gbit/s, all non-blocking ports
 60 Tbit/s system bandwidth

End-of-Life Switches

Current Switches

References 

Cisco products
Ethernet